Thủ Đức is a municipal city of Ho Chi Minh City, Vietnam. Thủ Đức may also refer to:

 Thủ Đức (urban district): a former urban district of Ho Chi Minh City
 Thủ Đức (rural district): a former rural district of Ho Chi Minh City that was dissolved in 1997, now the city of Thủ Đức

See also
Thủ Đức Military Academy